The Man Who Invented the Moon is a 2003 film by Normandie County Films written by Lee Kirk and directed by Laura Hegarty and John Colburn. The film stars Sean Gunn, Nicolette DiMaggio, Julie Dolan, and Brent Sexton and was produced by Larry Fitzgibbon. The Man Who Invented the Moon  was John Cabrera's directorial debut.

Cast
 Joe Colburn as Sammy Hughes
 Nicolette Dimaggio as Haley/Megan
 Julie Dolan as Haley 2
 Brent Sexton as Tommy
 Charles Brame as Abe Lincoln
 Matt Gunn as Dan McMahon
 Dave Barnes as Santa Claus
 Eddie Ebell as Jesus Christ
 Robert Gantzos as Davy Crocket
 Michael Cornacchia as Babe Ruth
 Michael Garvey as Super Amazing
 Cathi Stinson as Neighbor

Festival Showings
 The Midwest Independent Film Festival
 Saint Louis International Film Festival
 Los Angeles International Short Film Festival

References
 MWIFF 2006 Award Winners

External links

Official Site

2003 short films
American independent films
2003 films
2000s English-language films
2000s American films
2003 independent films
American short films